Kobierzyn may refer to the following p[laces in Poland:
Kobierzyn, part of the Dębniki district of Kraków
Kobierzyn, Lesser Poland Voivodeship
Kobierzyn, Pomeranian Voivodeship